, also pronounced Kyōho, was a  after Shōtoku and before Gembun. This period spanned the years from July 1716 through April 1736.

Change of era
 1716 : The era name of Kyōhō (meaning "Undergoing and Supporting") was created in response to the death of Tokugawa Ietsugu. The previous era ended and the new one commenced in Shōtoku 6, on the 22nd day of the 6th month.

Events of the Kyōhō era
 1717 (Kyōhō 2): Kyōhō reforms are directed and overseen by Shōgun Yoshimune.
 1718 (Kyōhō 3): The bakufu repaired the Imperial mausolea.
 1720 (Kyōhō 5, 6th month): The 26th High Priest of Nichiren Shōshū, Nichikan Shōnin, who is considered a great reformer of the sect, inscribed the Gohonzon which the lay Buddhist organisation SGI uses to bestow upon its members, after the Nichiren Shōshū priesthood, under the leadership of 67th High Priest Nikken, refused to do so.
 1721 (Kyōhō 6): Edo population of 1.1 million is world's largest city.
 1730 (Kyōhō 15): The Tokugawa shogunate officially recognizes the Dojima Rice Market in Osaka; and bakufu supervisors (nengyoji) are appointed to monitor the market and to collect taxes. The transactions relating to rice exchanges developed into securities exchanges, used primarily for transactions in public securities. The development of improved agriculture production caused the price of rice to fall in mid-Kyohō.
 August 3, 1730 (Kyōhō 15, 20th day of the 6th month): A fire broke out in Muromachi and 3,790 houses were burnt. Over 30,000 looms in Nishi-jin were destroyed. The bakufu distributed rice.
 1732 (Kyōhō 17): The Kyōhō famine was the consequence after swarms of locusts devastated crops in agricultural communities around the inland sea.
 1733 (Kyōhō 18): Ginseng grown in Japan begins to be available in the Japanese food markets.
 1735 (Kyōhō 20): Sweet potatoes were introduced into the Japanese diet.

Notes

References
 Adams, Thomas Francis Morton. (1953). Japanese Securities Markets: A Historical Survey. Tokyo: Seihei Okuyama.  OCLC 4376900
 Foreign Press Center. (1997). Japan: Eyes on the Country, Views of the 47 Prefectures. Tokyo: Foreign Press Center/Japan.
 Hall, John Whitney. (1988). Early Modern Japan (The Cambridge History of Japan, Vol. 4). Cambridge: Cambridge University Press. ;  OCLC 489633115
 Hayami, Akira, Osamu Saitō, Ronald P Toby. (2004) The Economic History of Japan: 1600–1990, Vol. 1, Emergence of Economic Society in Japan, 1600–1859. Oxford: Oxford University Press. ;  OCLC 314513300
 Nussbaum, Louis Frédéric and Käthe Roth. (2005). Japan Encyclopedia. Cambridge: Harvard University Press. ; OCLC 48943301
 Ponsonby-Fane, Richard A.B. (1956). Kyoto: the Old Capital, 794–1869. Kyoto: Ponsonby-Fane Memorial.  OCLC 36644
 Screech, Timon. (2006). Secret Memoirs of the Shoguns: Isaac Titsingh and Japan, 1779–1822. London: RoutledgeCurzon. ; OCLC 65177072
 Takekoshi, Yosaburō. (1930).  Economic Aspects of the History of the Civilization of Japan. London: Allen & Unwen, republished by Routledge /
 Titsingh, Isaac. (1834). Nihon Ōdai Ichiran; ou,  Annales des empereurs du Japon.  Paris: Royal Asiatic Society, Oriental Translation Fund of Great Britain and Ireland. OCLC 5850691.

External links 
 National Diet Library, "The Japanese Calendar" -- historical overview plus illustrative images from library's collection

Japanese eras
1710s in Japan
1720s in Japan
1730s in Japan